"The Ziff Who Came to Dinner" is the fourteenth episode of the fifteenth season of the American animated television series The Simpsons. It originally aired on the Fox network in the United States on March 14, 2004. The episode focuses on Artie Ziff, who takes residence in the Simpson family's attic after declaring bankruptcy. After playing poker with Homer and losing, he gives Homer all the shares of stock of his bankrupt company. Homer then gets arrested and Marge gets upset with Artie.

This is the third of nine episodes to date written by The Simpsons voice actor Dan Castellaneta and his wife, Deb Lacusta.

Plot
Homer takes Bart and Lisa to see The Wild Dingleberries Movie and he has to bring Ned Flanders' children with him, because Ned volunteered to take the senior citizens for ice cream for Jasper's birthday. However, at the Googolplex Theatre, the movie and every other kid-friendly movie is sold out, and Rod and Todd will not let Homer see a raunchy comedy called Teenage Sex Wager since it is one of many movies condemned by a Christian publication called "What Would Jesus View?". After hearing Lenny mention he had a small part in the horror movie The Re-Deadening as a gardener, Homer takes the kids to see the movie. The movie is very scary, causing it to scare Bart and Lisa at home, who think they hear noises from the attic. But when they look in the attic, their fears scare them away. When Bart and Lisa ask Homer and Marge to look in the attic, they discover Artie Ziff living there.

Artie explains that he was living in the attic because his Internet business, Ziffcorp, crashed in the dot-com bubble, and he lost all his money after spending it on many extravagant items which then got repossessed, including the repo vans. He chose to live with the Simpsons, claiming that Marge was the closest thing he ever had to true love - although Marge quickly points out that she and Artie only had one date where he almost raped her on their high school prom night. Artie promises that he will not hit on Marge if he stays with them, which Marge objects to, but Homer, Bart, and Lisa do not. While living with the family, Artie connects with Lisa by reading her The Corrections. He then tries to buy ice cream for Bart and Milhouse, but when his credit card gets cut up, he unsuccessfully attempts to hang himself. Homer gets Artie down and takes him to Moe's.

Marge sees on the news that the SEC is looking for Artie, who is playing poker with Homer and his friends. Homer wins 98% of Ziffcorp's outstanding stock. The SEC sweeps in to arrest Artie, but Homer says he owns 230 million shares of Ziffcorp, making him the majority stockholder. To protect himself, Artie has Homer take the blame. Homer is taken into SEC custody, placed on trial and ultimately sentenced to ten years in prison. Blaming Artie for this and angered by his selfishness, Marge kicks him out of the house and tells him she never wants to see him ever again.

Visiting Moe's Tavern, Artie encounters Patty and Selma, and Selma takes Artie to her apartment after he mentions putting Homer in prison. As they spend the night together, Artie makes a plan to turn over his corporate books in order to admit he is the real crook. He turns himself in, and Homer is released from prison. The family takes one last look at their "Uncle Artie", who is using a squirt bottle to put out the prisoners' cigarettes, much to their anger.

Critical reception
In a September 2008 review, Robert Canning of IGN gave the episode a 5.8 out of 10, saying "Unfortunately, ‘The Ziff Who Came to Dinner’ fails to match the previous episode's quality in both story and humor."

References

External links 
 

The Simpsons (season 15) episodes
2004 American television episodes
The Critic